"300 M.P.H. Torrential Outpour Blues" is a song written by Jack White and recorded by The White Stripes. It is the third track from the album Icky Thump, as well as one of the band's longest songs, at nearly five and a half minutes long.

The Washington Post called the song "a love song that opens as a quiet shuffle, then gently toggles the soft-loud-dynamics switch before a pealing 12-second guitar break erupts violently and without warning just past the two-minute mark before fading out -- an unexpected moment of brilliance".

Jack White, the guitarist of The White Stripes, explained that when writing this song he wanted to use as many different styles of blues as he could in one song and that "it goes from the really screeching, distorted, heavy blues song, to a wimpy Wurlitzer kind of loungey blues sound, to a white-boy takes on the blues, to real earthy, country blues."

References

2007 songs
The White Stripes songs
Songs written by Jack White
Blues rock songs
Punk blues songs